The 1988 Colorado State Rams football team represented Colorado State University in the Western Athletic Conference during the 1988 NCAA Division I-A football season. In their seventh season under head coach Leon Fuller, the Rams compiled a 1–10 record.

Schedule

References

Colorado State
Colorado State Rams football seasons
Colorado State Rams football